Marin Pîrcălabu (born 9 January 1952) is a Romanian wrestler. He competed at the 1976 Summer Olympics and the 1980 Summer Olympics.

References

1952 births
Living people
Romanian male sport wrestlers
Olympic wrestlers of Romania
Wrestlers at the 1976 Summer Olympics
Wrestlers at the 1980 Summer Olympics
People from Giurgiu County